Whiting Willauer (1906–1962) was an American ambassador to Costa Rica and Honduras. He is also considered as a key player during the 1954 operation against Arbenz in Guatemala.

Biography

Whiting Willauer was born on November 30, 1906, in New York City, New York. Willauer received his graduation from Princeton University and from the Harvard University Law School.

From 1931 to 1939, he practiced admiralty law in Boston, Massachusetts. He served as an attorney in the Criminal Division of the Department of Justice.

From 1941 to 1944, he served as executive secretary of China Defense Supplies, Incorporated, and also served as director of the Far East and Special Territories Branch of the Foreign Economic Administration during 1944 to 1945.

Along with General Claire L. Chennault, Willauer founded the Civil Air Transport (CAT) company in China in 1946. He was its executive vice president and later he became its president, he remained associated with the Civil Air Transport Company from 1946 until his resignation in 1954. In 1950, Whiting Willauer sold CAT to the Central Intelligence Agency.

He served as ambassador to Honduras from 1954 to 1958 and to Costa Rica from 1958 until his retirement in 1961. One of his key tasks while serving as the U.S. Ambassador to Honduras, after his appointment on 5 February 1954, was to provide the CIA team within neighboring Guatemala with any assistance that they required in the overthrow of that Government of Guatemala led by Jacobo Arbenz Guzman; he was even instructed to report to the CIA via the Under Secretary of State, Walter Bedell Smith, who had previously been the Director of Central Intelligence.

After a short retirement, Whiting Willauer died on 6 August 1962 at Nantucket, Massachusetts. Whiting Willauser was then buried at the New North Cemetery, Nantucket, County of Nantucket, Massachusetts.

References

1906 births
1962 deaths
Ambassadors of the United States to Costa Rica
Ambassadors of the United States to Honduras
Harvard Law School alumni
Princeton University alumni
Storm King School alumni